Miramar National Cemetery is a federal military cemetery in the city of San Diego, California. It is located in the north west corner of the Marine Corps Air Station Miramar on the grounds of old Camp Kearney (1917) and Camp Elliott (1942).

Miramar National Cemetery is considered an auxiliary of the Fort Rosecrans National Cemetery and is administered by the United States Department of Veterans Affairs.

History
On 30 January 2010, the Department of Veterans Affairs dedicated a new National Cemetery at the northwest corner of MCAS Miramar.  The cemetery is an extension of Fort Rosecrans National Cemetery and when complete will accommodate the remains of approximately 235,000 veterans and spouses.  Nearby Fort Rosecrans Cemetery closed to most casket burials in 1966, and prior to Miramar's opening, the only option for casket burials of San Diego region veterans was Riverside National Cemetery.

The cemetery design is sensitive to environmental considerations, preserving habitat for endangered California gnatcatchers and fairy shrimp.

The first interment occurred in November 2010; the first casket burial occurred in April 2011.

The cemetery contains 313 acres dedicated for full casket burials and cremated remains. It has 16 designated areas (not all currently being used)  for full casket burials and two Columbarium areas for urn interments. It also has two, "Committal Service Shelters" or open sided covered shelters. North of the central "Avenue of Flags" is a "Memorial Walk" with dedications and benches for reflections. A planned Ossuary is located at the end of the "Memorial Walk" and designated as the "Memorial Plaza." The Administration Office has an interior service room and a unique funeral possession lane behind it. Near the entrance is a "P.O.W. Plaza" where the bronze memorial to prisoners of war called "Liberation" is located.

Notable burials

Medal of Honor recipients
 Charles Schroeter (1837–1921), recipient from the American Civil War

Other burials
 Rudy Bukich (1930–2016), an American football player in the National Football League who played for fourteen seasons (1953 and 1956 to 1968). He served with the United States Army from 1954–1956.
 Jerry Coleman (1924–2014), a baseball broadcaster, a former manager of the San Diego Padres, a World Series winning Major League Baseball second baseman for the New York Yankees  and a Marine Corps pilot during World War II and the Korean War.
 Tim LaHaye (1926–2016), an evangelical Protestant minister who wrote and co-wrote more than 85 books, both fiction and non-fiction, including the Left Behind series. He enlisted in the United States Army Air Forces in 1944, and served in the European Theater of Operations during World War II as a machine gunner aboard a bomber.
 Don Marshall (1934–2016), actor known for his role as Dan Erickson in the television show Land of the Giants. He enlisted and served in the US Army during the Korean War.
 Charlie Paulk (1946–2014) professional basketball player

Eligibility
Burial in Miramar National Cemetery is available for eligible veterans, their spouses and dependents at no cost to the family and includes the gravesite, grave-liner, opening and closing of the grave, a headstone or marker, and perpetual care as part of a national shrine. For veterans, benefits may also include a burial flag (with case for active duty), and military funeral honors. Family members and other loved ones of deceased veterans may request Presidential Memorial Certificates.

Veterans discharged from active duty under conditions other than dishonorable and servicemembers who die while on active duty, active duty for training, or inactive duty training, as well as spouses and dependent children of veterans and active duty servicemembers, may be eligible for VA burial and memorial benefits including burial in a national cemetery. The veteran does not have to die before a spouse or dependent child can be eligible.

Reservists and National Guard members, as well as their spouses and dependent children, are eligible if they were entitled to retired pay at the time of death, or would have been upon reaching requisite age.

Burial of dependent children is limited to unmarried children under 21 years of age, or under 23 years of age if a full-time student at an approved educational institution. Unmarried adult children who become physically or mentally disabled and incapable of self-support before age 21, or age 23 if a full-time student, also are eligible for burial.

A Federal law passed in 2010 (Public Law 111-275) extends burial benefits to certain parents of servicemembers who die as a result of hostile activity or from combat training-related injuries who are buried in a national cemetery in a gravesite with available space. The biological or adopted parents of a servicemember who dies in combat or while performing training in preparation for a combat mission, leaving no surviving spouse or dependent child, may be buried with the deceased servicemember if the Secretary of Veterans Affairs determines that there is available space. The law applies to servicemembers who died on or after Oct. 7, 2001 and to parents who died on or after Oct. 13, 2010.

Monuments and memorials
Miramar National Cemetery has several memorials and monuments.
 The Liberation – by sculptor Richard Becker. It was dedicated on Sept. 16, 2011. It "honors the sacrifice of veterans captured during America's foreign wars."  The San Diego American Ex-Prisoners of War-Chapter 1 provided "the 15-foot-tall figurative composition of a bronze soldier and POW flag atop a concrete base."

Memorial Walk
 Jewish War Veterans
 US Navy Seabees
 US Navy Nurse Corps
 Blue Star Memorial by the California Garden Club, Palomar District
 Korean War Memorial – Chosin Reservoir by the San Diego Chapter of the Chosin Few
 US Army Special Forces Memorial
 US Paratroopers "Airborne" Memorial – added March 201

Avenue of Flags
The Avenue of Flags contains fifty (50) steel flag poles with lighting to display all the American flags along the avenue twenty four (24) hours a day. The Avenue extends from near the cemetery entrance eastward toward a giant American flag and flagpole at the east end of the roadway at the Flag Assembly Area.

It was dedicated on Saturday 28 January 2012 with North San Diego County Supervisor Bill Horn, Officers of the United States Armed Forces, representatives of the Department of Veterans Affairs and numerous San Diego and Orange County veterans groups. It was hosted by the Fort Rosecrans and Miramar National Cemetery Support Foundation, a 501(c)(3) non-profit organization, with assistance from a US Marine Corps color guard and band from the 3rd Marine Aircraft Wing.

The Support Foundation takes care of flag replacement and repair. It was instrumental in the equipment, purchase and volunteer installation of the flagpoles with proper lighting. Volunteers provide about 1,000 hours of labor by digging trenches, assembling and landscaping. Noteworthy volunteers come from the Boy Scouts of America and Young Marines. They were joined by volunteers from the USS Ronald Reagan (CVN-76), Marine Corps Air Station Miramar and many civilians.

Gallery

First interments: November 22, 2010

References

External links

 Miramar National Cemetery main web page.
 
 

United States national cemeteries
Tourist attractions in San Diego
Geography of San Diego
Cemeteries in San Diego County, California
Landmarks in San Diego
2010 establishments in California